Olga Alfredovna Koch (born 1 September 1992) is a Russian-British stand-up comedian, writer, and actress.

Early life
Koch is the daughter of Alfred Koch, head of the State Committee for State Property Management of the Russian Federation from 1996 to 1997.

When she was 13, her family moved to the UK, settling in Surrey, where she was educated at The American School in England. She studied computer programming at New York University, and also trained at the Upright Citizens Brigade Theatre.

Career
Koch's first show was in 2016, entitled Me, Me, Me. This was followed by Data Night and Good Vibes in 2017. In 2018, she was nominated for Best Newcomer at the Edinburgh Comedy Awards for her debut hour, Fight. She was named Quantum Leopard Champion of Champions for 2018, jointly with Zoë Tomalin.

A recording of her next show If / Then was released as a vinyl record on Monkey Barrel Records in November 2020.

She has appeared on The Now Show, Mock the Week, Pls Like, Richard Osman's House of Games, Pointless Celebrities and QI, and written for Newsjack and BBC Three's A Quickie in the Office.

In 2020 Koch hosted a web series for Dave called ‘Bad Advice with Olga Koch’.

Koch regularly appears in lineups for charity shows, most notably hosting Canned Laughter's Karaoke Roulette.

Her BBC Radio 4's Olga Koch: Fight won the 2022 The Best Radio Comedy Award at Writers’ Guild Awards winners.

, she is working on a show called "Just Friends" (WIP).

Her show "Homecoming" was released on Amazon Prime in May 2022 as part of Soho Theatre Live.

Olga will be appearing in the third series of Mel Giedroyc: Unforgivable, after filming took place in July 2022.

Personal life
She lives in Angel, London.

References

External links

British women comedians
Living people
1992 births
New York University alumni
Russian emigrants to the United Kingdom
21st-century British comedians
English expatriates in the United States